William Rigg may refer to:
 William Rigg (priest)
 William Rigg (politician)